Liolaemus chacoensis, the Chaco tree iguana, is a species of lizard in the family  Liolaemidae. It is native to Paraguay, Bolivia, and Argentina.

References

chacoensis
Reptiles described in 1948
Reptiles of Paraguay
Reptiles of Bolivia
Reptiles of Argentina
Taxa named by Benjamin Shreve